Betty May Nuthall Shoemaker (née Nuthall; 23 May 1911 – 8 November 1983) was an English tennis player. Known for her powerful forehand, according to Wallis Myers of The Daily Telegraph and the Daily Mail, Nuthall was ranked in the world's top 10 in 1927, 1929 through 1931, and 1933, reaching a career high of world no. 4 in 1929. In 1930, Nuthall won the women's singles title at the U.S. Championships.

Early life
Betty Nuthall was born on 23 May 1911 in Surbiton and grew up in Richmond. She was the eldest child of Stuart Nuthall, who worked on the London and South Western Railway and later became a hotel proprietor,  and his wife Mary, both of them keen tennis players.

Career

Nuthall's father taught her tennis. She won the junior championships of Great Britain in 1924 (aged 13), 1925 and 1926.

In 1927 at the age of 16, Nuthall tied Elisabeth Moore as the then-youngest women's singles finalist ever at the U.S. National Championships. Nuthall lost the final to Helen Wills in straight sets while serving under-handed.

Also in 1927, Nuthall played on the British Wightman Cup team and defeated Helen Jacobs in her debut. She also represented Great Britain in the 1929 and 1931–34 Wightman Cup competitions.

In 1930, Nuthall became the first non-American since 1892 to win a women's singles title at the U.S. National Championships, defeating Anna McCune Harper in straight sets. She was the last British female player to win the title until Virginia Wade won in 1968. In 1931, she reached the singles final of the French International Championships but lost in two sets to top-seeded Cilly Aussem. Also in 1930, she won the mixed doubles with her recurring partner Pat Spence. Nuthall and he went for the British Hard Court Championships in April and were only eliminated in the final, while in May they won the mixed title at the French International Championships.

At the U.S. Championships in 1933, Nuthall won a quarterfinal versus Alice Marble 6–8, 6–0, 7–5 after being down two breaks of serve at 1–5 in the final set. In the semifinals versus Moody, Nuthall won the first set 6–2 in just 12 minutes, which was the first set Wills had lost at this tournament since 1926. Moody, however, turned around the match and won the last two sets 6–3, 6–2 despite losing her serve twice in the second set. Nuthall never again reached the quarterfinals of a Grand Slam singles tournament.

Nuthall won women's doubles titles at the 1930, 1931, and 1933 U.S. Championships and at the 1931 French Championships. She won mixed doubles championships at the 1929 and 1931 U.S. Championships and at the 1931 and 1932 French Championships.

Nuthall was inducted into the International Tennis Hall of Fame in 1977.

Personal life
She and doubles partner Pat Spence were a couple off the court, and they won the French Open mixed doubles tournament in 1931. In 1954, she married Franklin Shoemaker, who died in 1982. On 8 November 1983, Nuthall died in New York City of a coronary arrest.

Grand Slam finals

Singles: 3 (1 title, 2 runners-up)

Doubles (4 titles, 2 runners-up)

Mixed doubles (4 titles, 1 runner-up)

Grand Slam singles tournament timeline

R = tournament restricted to French nationals and held under German occupation.

1In 1946, the French Championships were held after Wimbledon.

See also 
 Performance timelines for all female tennis players who reached at least one Grand Slam final

References

External links
 
 British Pathé Reel – "Southampton. 'We're Glad She's Glad – She's Glad We're Glad!'

1911 births
1983 deaths
English female tennis players
French Championships (tennis) champions
People from Surbiton
International Tennis Hall of Fame inductees
United States National champions (tennis)
Grand Slam (tennis) champions in women's singles
Grand Slam (tennis) champions in women's doubles
Grand Slam (tennis) champions in mixed doubles
Tennis people from Greater London